Henry Paterson (born 26 February 1997) is an Australian rugby sevens player.

Biography 
Paterson is the son of former Roosters forward and Rothmans Medallist Trevor Paterson. He was set to make his Olympic debut in Tokyo but had to withdraw on the eve of the Games due to injury.

Paterson replaced Jed Stuart in the fourth round of the Sevens World Series in Seville, for the 2022 Spain Sevens. He scored a hat-trick and helped his side win the 2022 London Sevens final against New Zealand.

Paterson was selected for the Australian sevens squad for the 2022 Commonwealth Games in Birmingham. He was named again to represent Australia at the Rugby World Cup Sevens in Cape Town.

References 

1997 births
Living people
Male rugby sevens players
Australia international rugby sevens players
Rugby sevens players at the 2022 Commonwealth Games